The 48th Infantry Division (German: 48. Infanterie-Division) was a German division in World War II.

Operational history
The 48th Infantry division was formed in November 1943 in Ostend, West Flanders from the 171st Reserve Division. It had a strong Polish representation throughout its ranks. 

The 171st Reserve Division had been established on 1 October 1942 in the occupied Netherlands and stationed in the Arnhem area. In February 1943, the division was transferred to Diksmuide in Belgium. On November 23, 1943, the 171st Reserve Division was restructured and renamed the 48th Infantry Division.

After completing reorganization in February 1944, the unit was assigned to coastal protection near Ostend. In August 1944, after the collapse of the Normandy Front, the 48th was transferred to France.

First engaged in the Chartres area by the 3rd US Army, it performed poorly, being continually driven back by the 3rd Army through Metz and finally the Siegfried Line, where it collapsed altogether and was absorbed into the 559th Volksgrenadier Division. it was sent to the Eastern Front assigned to the German 8th Army defending Vienna, where it surrendered to the Soviets.

Organization
 Grenadier-Regiment 126
 Grenadier-Regiment 127
 Artillerie-Regiment 148,
 Divisions-Füsilier-Kompanie 48
 Anti-Tank Battalion 148
 Engineer-Battalion 148
 Signals Battalion 148

References
 Mitcham, W, Samuel. Hitlers Legions

0*048
Military units and formations established in 1943
Military units and formations disestablished in 1945